"Shooting and crying" ( yorim ve bochim) is an expression used to describe books, films or other forms of media that portray soldiers expressing remorse for actions they were ordered to undertake during their service. It has often been associated with a practice that some former Israel Defense Force soldiers follow.

Descriptions
Gil Hochberg described "shooting and crying" as a soldier being "sorry for things I had to do." This "non-apologetic apology" was the self-critique model advanced in Israel in many politically reflective works of literature and cinema as "a way of maintaining the nation's self-image as youthful and innocent. Along with its sense of vocation against the reality of war, growing military violence, occupation, invasion, [there was] [...] an overall sense that things were going wrong."

Felice Naomi Wonnenberg (writing for the book Contemporary Jewish Reality in Germany and Its Reflection in Film) described "shooting and crying" as people being "aware of the problematic issues of war, yet still take part in it."

Sarah Benton described it as "an act through which the soldier cleans his conscience (at least somewhat), without taking personal responsibility or any practical steps, either to prevent 'inappropriate behavior by soldiers in the field' as it occurs or to redress injustice and prosecute criminals later."

Karen Grumberg noted that "the Zionist soldier, a man with a conscience, loathes violence but realizes he must act violently to survive; the dilemma causes him to weep while pulling the trigger. Looking inward, he despairs at the violence he feels compelled to enact this way because he fears his moral corruption."

Amir Vodka wrote that "It typically depicts the IDF in a critical light, as a traumatizer of young soldiers, yet the genre itself is often criticized for turning the assailants into victims, and in a sense allowing the continuation of war under the guise of self-victimization."

Appearances in media

Literature
 Khirbet Khizeh (1949)
 Si’ah Lohamim (Fighters’ Discourse) (1968)

Film
 Resisim (1989)
 The Deserter's Wife (1991)
 Z'man Emet (1991)
 Time for Cherries (1991)
 Beaufort (2007)
 Waltz with Bashir (2008)
 Lebanon (2009)

Television
 Fauda (2015–20)

See also
 Command responsibility
 Criticism of the Israeli government
 Crocodile tears
 Military–entertainment complex
 Military psychology
 Misery porn
 Mistakes were made
 Oscar bait
 War film

References

Hebrew words and phrases
Israeli culture
Military psychology